Marie Heritesová (March 23, 1881 – July 13, 1970), known as Madame Kohnova in the United States, was a Czech violinist and violin teacher.

Early life 
Marie Antonie Heritesová was born on 23 March 1881 at Vodňany č. 1, Bohemia, Austria-Hungary, the daughter of writer and pharmacist . She was baptized Catholic the next day. As a girl she lived in Cleveland, Ohio with her family for a time, and studied violin there. On their return to Europe in 1894, she pursued further musical studies with Otakar Ševčík at the conservatory in Prague.

Career 
Heritesová debuted as a concert violinist in the Rudolfinum in Prague, in 1902. She was invited to play at the Victor Hugo centenary observances in Paris, and at the festivities around the coronation of Edward VII in England. She toured in Europe and accompanied singer Marie Gorlenko-Doline in Russia. She was a soloist with the Czech Philharmonic. In 1904, she traveled again to the United States, this time on a concert tour with pianist Jan Heřman. The duo played at the Louisiana Purchase Exposition in St. Louis during this tour. She made two gramophone recordings in Prague after 1909.

In the United States again during World War I, this time as a widow with a daughter, she taught violin at Northwestern Conservatory of Music in Minneapolis, and the Texas Woman's University in Denton, Texas, where she was head of the violin department. She gave a recital at Coe College in Iowa during the 1916-1917 season. In 1919 she appeared as M. Heritesova-Kohnova in a list of members of the Society for the Advancement of Slavic Study, an American organization. Also in 1919, she supported a fellow Czech musician, singer Emmy Destinn, in a concert in Dallas. A 1935 reviewer credited her performance with "deep insight and interpretive power."

Personal life 
In 1905, Marie Heritesová married Josef E. Kohn, an American industrialist; she used the married surname Kohnová. Kohn died in 1910, and Heritesová returned to her family in Prague and Vodňany with her young daughter, Marie (1906-2008). She left as World War I began, fearful that their American citizenship would become hazardous in Central Europe. Her daughter married Frank Holecek in Chicago, the nephew of František Herites' friend, writer Josef Holeček.

Kohnova died in Gulfport, Pinellas County, Florida in 1970, aged 89 years. Her grave is in St. Petersburg, Florida.

References

External links 

 Photographs of Maria Heritesová as a young woman with her violin, in the Langhans online archive.
 

1881 births
1970 deaths
Czech violinists
Women violinists
Texas Woman's University faculty
American people of Bohemian descent
Austro-Hungarian emigrants to the United States